The Ormond Hotel (also known as The Flagler Hotel) was a historic hotel in Ormond Beach, Florida, United States. It was located at 15 East Granada Boulevard.

History

Built by John Anderson and J. D. Price, the hotel opened on January 1, 1888. By spring of 1889, the Florida East Coast Railway extended its service from Jacksonville to Daytona, and railroad magnate Henry Flagler bought The Ormond Hotel and enlarged it to handle 600 guests. It became one in a series of his hotels positioned along the line to accommodate his passengers, including The Ponce De León Hotel in St. Augustine, The Royal Poinciana Hotel and The Breakers Hotel in Palm Beach, and The Royal Palm Hotel in Miami. In 1914, John D. Rockefeller arrived at The Ormond Hotel for the winter season, and rented an entire floor for his staff and himself. After four seasons at the hotel, he bought The Casements, a nearby estate also beside the Halifax River.

On November 24, 1980, The Ormond Hotel was added to the U.S. National Register of Historic Places. In 1992, the structure was razed to the ground to make way for a condominium. The original cupola now stands in a riverfront park directly west of the site of the former hotel.

References

External links
Florida's Office of Cultural and Historical Programs
Volusia County listings
Volusia County markers
Great Floridians of Ormond Beach
History of Ormond Beach

Hotel buildings completed in 1887
National Register of Historic Places in Volusia County, Florida
Demolished hotels in Florida
Florida East Coast Railway
Railway hotels in the United States
Historic American Buildings Survey in Florida
Ormond Beach, Florida
1888 establishments in Florida